The Apostolic Vicariate of Jaén en Peru or Vicariate Apostolic of San Francisco Javier is a Latin Church apostolic vicariate of the Catholic Church in Peru . Its cathedral is located in the episcopal see of Jaén, in Peru's Cajamarca province. It remains immediately exempt subject to the Holy See and not part of an ecclesiastical province.

History 
 January 11, 1946: Established as Apostolic Prefecture of San Francisco Javier from the Diocese of Cajamarca, Diocese of Chachapoyas and Apostolic Vicariate of San Gabriel de la Dolorosa del Marañón
 April 24, 1971: Promoted as Apostolic Vicariate of San Francisco Javier
 November 22, 1980: Renamed as Apostolic Vicariate of Jaén en Perú

Bishops

Incumbent ordinaries, in reverse chronological order 
 Mostly Jesuits (denoted by the S.J. post-nominal)
 Vicar Apostolics of Jaén en Perú 
 Bishop Gilberto Alfredo Vizcarra Mori, S.J. (June 11, 2014 - )
 Bishop Santiago María García de la Rasilla (November 11, 2005 – June 11, 2014)
 Archbishop Pedro Ricardo Barreto Jimeno, S.J. (Apostolic Administrator July 17, 2004 – November 11, 2005)
 Bishop Pedro Ricardo Barreto Jimeno, S.J. (later Archbishop) (November 21, 2001 – July 17, 2004), appointed Archbishop of Huancayo
 Bishop José María Izuzquiza Herranz, S.J. (March 30, 1987 – November 21, 2001)
 Bishop Augusto Vargas Alzamora, S.J. (June 8, 1978 – August 23, 1985); future Cardinal
 Vicars Apostolic of San Francisco Javier  
 Bishop Antonio de Hornedo Correa, S.J. (April 24, 1971 – July 9, 1977), appointed Bishop of Chachapoyas
 Prefects Apostolic of San Francisco Javier 
 Fr. Antonio de Hornedo Correa, S.J. (later Bishop) (August 6, 1963 – April 24, 1971)
 Fr. Juan Albacete, S.J. (November 7, 1961 – December 4, 1962)
 Fr. José Oleaga Guerequiz, S.J. (October 23, 1959 – 1961)
 Fr. Ignacio García Martin, S.J. (July 11, 1946 - 1958)

Other priest of this vicariate who became bishop
Ángel Francisco Simón Piorno, appointed Bishop of Chachapoyas in 1991

References

External links
 GCatholic.org
 Catholic Hierarchy 
  Vicariate website

Apostolic vicariates
Roman Catholic dioceses in Peru
Christian organizations established in 1946
Roman Catholic dioceses and prelatures established in the 20th century
1946 establishments in Peru